Ceylan Avcı (b. 26 June 1974) is an Idealistic and national conservative Turkish female Turkish folk music artist, musician, arranger, producer, television presenter and actress. Her mother is from Bayburt and her father is from Pertek, Tunceli. She emigrated to Duisburg, West Germany with her family at the age of 8 and lived there until she was 15. in 1990, she returned to Turkey with her family. Ceylan started her career in 1984 as a child singer and actress. She started her career by taking recurring roles in a number of movies and released her own studio albums.
Her 1986 album, Seni Sevmeyen Ölsün, sold 1.3 million copies in Turkey.
Her 2005 album, Ah Gönlüm, received a gold certification from Mü-Yap.
She has been awarded twice as the Best Female Folk Singer at the Kral TV Video Music Awards.
Ceylan celebrated the 35th anniversary of her music career in 2019 and released a single with her daughter Melodi Bozkurt.
She also hosted a 2012-2016 years of music television programme under the name of Ceylan Show which aired on Kanal 7 and Samanyolu TV.

Discography

Albums 
 Yaktı Beni (1984, Şah Plak)
 Bir Gün Bana Döneceksin (1984, Şah Plak)
 Kaderin Tuzakları (1985, Şah Plak)
 Yolun Açık Olsun/Garip Anam (1985, Şah Plak)
 Seni Sevmeyen Ölsün (1986, Şah Plak)
 Sevmek Günah mı/Asker Türküsü (1986, Şah Plak)
 Bırakmam Seni (1987, Şah Plak)
 Sev Beni Seveyim Seni (1988, Şah Plak)
 Sana da Güvenilmez/Ağlama Yar (1988, Şah Plak)
 Vallah – Hep Ezildim (1989, Ceylan Music)
 Allah Aşkına (1989, Cem Music)
 Kadersiz Doğmuşum/Arabacı (1990, Ceylan Music)
 Beni Bende Bitirdiler (1990, Ceylan Music)
 Gurbet Yolcusu (1991, Şenay Music)
 Hayret Nasıl Yaşıyorum (1991, Bayar Music)
 Geri Ver Beni (1992, Bayar Music)
 Şantaj & Montaj (1993, Özdemir Plak)
 Kritik Etme Beni (1994, Özdemir Plak)
 Kır Çiçeğim/Ayrılmam (1995, Özdemir Plak)
 Canımdan Ayırdılar (1996, Kral Müzik)
 Güldestim (1997, Prestij Music)
 Ağlayı Ağlayı – Le Le Kirvo (1998, A1 Music)
 Zeyno (2000, İdobay Music)
 Can Cana (2001, Universal Musics Records)
 Söyle (2003, Raks Music)
 Gelsene (13 January 2004, Özdemir Plak)
 Ah Gönlüm (8 April 2005, Özdemir Plak) (certificate: Golden)
 Pirimi Ararım (1 September 2006, Popüler Music)
 Sana Söz (23 March 2007, Özdemir Plak)
 Bir Daha mı? (10 November 2008, Özdemir Plak)
 Türkülerin Ceylan'ı (2009, Seyhan Müzik)
 Ceylan Arabesk (2011)
 Kendisi Lazım (2012)
 Hım Hım Yar (Entarisi Dım Dım Yar) (2014)
 Bana Bir Şey Söyle (2014)
 Ceylan'dan 2016 (2016, Ceylan Music)

Singles 
 "Çeker Giderim" (2014, Uzelli Casette)
 "Koptum Bu Gece" (2017, Divan Music)
 "Kara Kız Kurbanın Olim" (2017, Zara Music)
 "Tillillo" (2018, TMC Music)
 "Severim Ama Güvenemem ki" (feat. Melodi Bozkurt, Kalan Music) (2019)
 "Mamudo 2019" (2019, Kemal Aslan Music)
 "Cennetim Ol" (2019, Olimpiyat Media Music)
 "İlle de Sen" (2020, Seyhan Müzik)
 "Ne Feryat Edersin Divane Bülbül" (2020, GAM Music)
 "Bir Sivaslı Uğruna" (2020, Emrah Music)
 "Islanmış Kirpiklerin" (2021, Major Music)
 "Birileri Kandırmış" (2021, Minareci Plaque)
 "Mashup" (2021, Melankolia Music)
 "Senin Kadar Hiç Kimseyi Sevmedim" (2021, Poll Prodcution)
 "Eski Tadım Yok Artık" (2021, Ferdfion Music)
 "Sen Affetsen Ben Affetmem" (2022, UKopuz Music)
 "Yansın Ankara" (2022, Turkuola Music)

Football team anthem 
 Fenerbahçe S.K.: 1995-96 1.Lig Ali Şen Başkan Fener Şampiyon (Halay) (feat. Alişan, Yurtseven Kardeşler, Nuray Hafiftaş, Tuğba Ekinci, Ercan Saatçi, İsmail YK, Adnan Şenses, Metin Şentürk)

Awards and nominations

References

External links 
 
 
 Ceylan on Spotify
 

1974 births
Bağlama players
Composers of Ottoman classical music
Child musicians
Istanbul Technical University alumni
Living people
Turkish television actresses
People from Pertek
People from Bayburt
Turkish Islamists
Turkish Sunni Muslims
Turkish expatriates in West Germany
Turkish women television presenters
Turkish film score composers
Turkish television actresses
Zaza people
Turkish television talk show hosts
Turkish child actresses
Turkish folk musicians
Turkish women songwriters
Turkish lyricists
Turkish folk-pop singers
Turkish music arrangers
Turkish women record producers
Turkish film actresses
20th-century Turkish women musicians
21st-century Turkish women musicians